T. maculata may refer to:

 Tajuria maculata, an Asian butterfly
 Tegeticula maculata, a North American moth
 Temnaspis maculata, a leaf beetle
 Tanipone maculata, a Malagasy ant
 Terebra maculata, an auger snail
 Terenura maculata, a South American bird
 Terrapene maculata, a box turtle
 Tetraselmis maculata, a green algae
 Teuthowenia maculata, a glass squid
 Thecacera maculata, a sea slug
 Thesprotia maculata, a praying mantis
 Tillandsia maculata, an air plant
 Timelaea maculata, a brush-footed butterfly
 Tipula maculata, a Palearctic cranefly
 Tonna maculata, a tun shell
 Toxodera maculata, a mantid native to Malaysia
 Trachylepis maculata, a Guyanese skink
 Trapania maculata, a sea slug
 Triakis maculata, a hound shark
 Trichis maculata, a ground beetle
 Trichocoptodera maculata, a ground beetle
 Trichopilia maculata, a New World orchid
 Triopha maculata, a sea slug
 Tritonia maculata, a dendronotid nudibranch
 Turritella maculata, a sea snail